In Our Style is an album by David Murray and Jack DeJohnette, released on the Japanese DIW label in 1986. It features five duo performances by Murray and DeJohnette with Fred Hopkins joining on two additional numbers.

Reception 

AllMusic's Scott Yanow awarded the album 4 stars, writing that "David Murray, doubling on tenor and bass clarinet, interacts with drummer Jack Dejohnette and (on two of the seven selections) bassist Fred Hopkins for a set of originals by Murray, DeJohnette and Butch Morris. The duo/trio explore a variety of moods with Murray's extroverted and advanced solos generally serving as the lead voice. Although an avant-garde set, this Japanese import has its mellow and melodic moments before the fire takes over again."

Track listing 
 "In Your Style" (Morris) -  6:15  
 "Tin Can Alley" (DeJohnette) - 5:39  
 "Both Feet on the Ground" (Murray) - 5:09  
 "The Dice" (Morris) - 8:17  
 "Pastel Rhapsody" (DeJohnette) - 6:39  
 "Great Peace" (Murray) - 6:49  
 "Kalimba" (DeJohnette) - 5:37

Personnel 
 David Murray - tenor saxophone, bass clarinet
 Jack DeJohnette - drums, piano
 Fred Hopkins - bass (tracks 1 & 4)

References 

1986 albums
David Murray (saxophonist) albums
Jack DeJohnette albums
DIW Records albums